Hans-Busso (Arthur Rudolf) von Busse (7 May 1930, Oppeln, Upper Silesia – 7 November 2009, Munich) was a German architect and academic.

Selected buildings 
 1957: Residence Riedmayer on Starnberger See (with Hans Peter Buddeberg)
 1961–1966: Heilig-Geist-Kirche in Waakirchen-Schaftlach
 1962: Kongress Centre at the Rose Garden, Coburg
 1963: Erlöserkirche, Erding
 1969–1972: Gemeindeakademie of the Lutheran Church Franken in Schwarzenbruck-Rummelsberg
 1970: Swimming hall in Rheine/Westfalen
 1970–1972: Apartment house in München-Schwabing
 1980: Restaurant for the Evangelische Akademie Tutzing
 1987–1992: Passenger hall at the Munich airport
 1990: Annex for the Munich Municipal Archive
 1990: Gnadenkirche in Würzburg-Sanderau
 1991: Berufsbildungswerk für Blinde und Sehbehinderte in Soest
 1992: Veranstaltungszentrum Stadtschloß in Lichtenfels
 1995: Cultural centre in Witten
 1996: Chapel in

References

External links 
 Hans-Busso von Busse kuenstlerdatenbank.ifa.de

20th-century German architects
German academics
1930 births
2009 deaths
People from Opole